Craney Island may refer to:

 Craney Island (Virginia)
 Harkers Island, North Carolina, formerly known as Craney Island
 Craney Island (Maryland) in Charles County, Maryland